The 1991 Navy Midshipmen football team represented the United States Naval Academy during the 1991 NCAA Division I-A football season as an independent. It was the program's fewest wins in a season since the winless 1948 season.

Schedule

Personnel

Game summaries

Army

The Midshipmen managed to steal all four Army mules in the week prior to the game.

References

Navy
Navy Midshipmen football seasons
Navy Midshipmen football